Michael Sgan-Cohen (2 March 1944 – 20 February 1999) was an Israeli artist, art historian, curator and critic. His oeuvre touches different realms of the Israeli experience and the Hebrew language, displaying a strong connection to the Jewish Scriptures. His works were nurtured by his extensive knowledge of Art history, philosophy, Biblical Texts, Jewish thought and Mysticism, which in turn illuminated all these pursuits. His engagement with Judaism and the Bible as a secular scholar and his vast knowledge of modern and contemporary art contributed to the development of a distinctive approach which combined Jewish and Israeli symbols and images to create a multilayered and contemporary artistic language.

Sgan-Cohen's art was anticipatory in many respects: his concept of Israeli identity as part of Jewish Identity developed long before other artists began to see things in these terms. This reflected in his profound involvement with the formative Jewish sacred texts, both intellectually and by embedding Jewish thought into the essence of his artistic practice. He was one of the pioneers in the sophisticated use of the Hebrew language as a means of expression in contemporary art.

Life 
Michael Sgan-Cohen was born in Jerusalem in 1944. His father, Dr. Meir Sgan-Cohen, was a well-known figure in Jerusalem and president Yitzhak Ben-Zvi's personal physician. Sgan-Cohen graduated in Art History and Philosophy from the Hebrew University of Jerusalem in 1969. In the late sixties, while still a student, Sgan-Cohen began writing short articles on art for the literary and cultural supplement of the daily newspaper Haaretz (edited by Benjamin Tammuz).

Between 1969 and 1978 Sgan-Cohen lived in Los Angeles and New York state. In 1973 he earned his MA degree in art history from the University of California (UCLA) in Los Angeles. Sgan-Cohen moved to New York in late 1973 to study with the art historian and critic Leo Steinberg. During this period, he was associated with the "New York Group" of Israeli artists including Pinchas Cohen-Gan, Benny Efrat, Michael Gitlin and Buky Swchartz. In 1976 he began to work as an artist. In 1978 Sgan-Cohen had his first solo exhibition at the Kibbutz Gallery in Tel Aviv. During his years in New York, Sgan-Cohen taught art history at the Brooklyn College and at the School of Visual Arts. He wrote for a number of art journals, such as Art in America, Art Forum and Art press, as well as for Hebrew journals like Mussag, Proza, Kav, Studio and Monitin. He wrote the catalogue articles for Motti Mizrahi (1988) and Ya'akov Dorchin (1990) for The Venice Biennale curated by Adam Baruch. In 1989 Sgan-Cohen earned his PhD from the City University of New York (CUNY). His dissertation dealt with the artist and architect Frederick Kiessler, who designed the Shrine of the Book in the Israel Museum.

Between 1977 and 1978 Sgan-Cohen returned to Israel and taught at Bezalel Academy of Arts and Design in Jerusalem as well as at the University of Haifa. In 1987 he permanently settled in Jerusalem and since 1990 served as a lecturer in several Art Institutes in Israel including Oranim Academic College in Kiryat Tivon (1990–98), Kalisher Art Academy in Tel Aviv (1990–98), The School of Visual Theatre in Jerusalem (1991–94) and Bezalel Academy of Arts and Design in Jerusalem (1992–98).

In 1993 Sgan-Cohen had a solo exhibition at the library of foyer of the Tel Aviv Museum of Art. In 1994 he had an extensive solo exhibition at the Ramat Gan Museum of Israeli Art. The following years he had two joint exhibitions—in 1995 with Haim Maor at the Museum of Jewish Art in Bar'am and in 1996 with Tsibi Geva at Julie M. Gallery in Tel Aviv.

Michael Sgan-Cohen curated two major retrospective exhibitions of the painter Lea Nickel (1995) and the sculptor Yehiel Shemi (1997) at the Tel Aviv Museum of Art.

In 1997 Sgan-Cohen was the recipient of the America-Israel Cultural Foundation Prize for Excellence in Plastic Arts and in 1998 he won the Minister of Education and Culture Prize.

He died of an illness in 1999.

During his life and posthumously, Sgan-Cohen's works participated in many prominent exhibitions in Israel, Europe and the U.S. Between 2004 and 2005 an extensive retrospective exhibition of his work was held at the Israel Museum in Jerusalem.

In August 2014 a street was named after Michael Sgan-Cohen and his father in The German Colony neighborhood in Jerusalem.

Work 
Life in America sharpened Sgan-Cohen's preoccupation with Hebrew language, Jewish thought (particularly the Bible) and Mysticism and gradually led him from the theoretical articulation of ideas to visual expression. Michael Sgan-Cohen was primarily concerned with ideas. His approach to the visual arts may, accordingly, be considered "conceptual", but not in the standard art-historical kind of sense. The art object was for him a medium of reflection on the fundamental problems of Jewish identity, particularly of the emerging Israeli culture. Sgan-Cohen's long stay in New York City served to sharpen his awareness of the uniqueness of the Israeli perspective in the role of Jewish culture in the life of modern Jews. His recurrent treatment of the theme of Nevo, the observation of the Land of Israel from the outside in the position of Moses before he died, attests for this deep concern, and to his attempt to form an Israeli style in the art without becoming provincial or parochial and without falling into the trap of nostalgia.

A major role in Michael Sgan-Cohen's conception of art is given to the word and especially the Hebrew word. This does not only reflect the artist's preoccupation with ideas and intellectual reflection, but also his recognition of the text as the fundamental medium and subject characterizing Jewish culture. Sgan-Cohen was one of the pioneers in the sophisticated use of the Hebrew language as a means of expression in contemporary visual art. Hebrew served in his view as the bridge between Jewish heritage, particularly the Bible, and the contemporary search for Israeli cultural identity. His works are replete with the complex deployment of culturally charged Hebrew phrases and with the Hebrew Alphabet as a visual theme. The drawn or painted Hebrew word served him as the way in which a generally non-visual, verbal tradition can be approached in the visual medium. The Hinneni (1978) theme is just one example of this use of words as visual images, the word becoming a powerful effect on the eye. In other paintings, he portrayed the body in its basic "alphabetic" gestures, placed his self-portrait in a text, copied whole chapters from the bible and made writing itself into a painted image. In those actions, Sgan-Cohen's developed a unique poetic and artistic view of the visual aspects of the Hebrew word and the Hebrew alphabet. Naturally, the Bible became a major source in his art: Moses, The Akedah, Jonah and the Leviathan, Psalms, etc. In a very ambitious and project, Sgan-Cohen made twelve large panels in which the whole text of the Twelve Minor Prophets (Trei Assar) were copied, a homage to the long tradition of the meticulous reproduction of the word of the prophet and at token of respect to the sanctity of the word. In his works, he thus brought together in a highly original way the sensibilities of the critical, self-reflexive post-modern artist who understands the late and the repetitive with those of a modernist one who appreciated the archaic and the primary.

Michael Sgan-Cohen's work shifts between painting and icon, reality and myth, nostalgia and critical distance. His conceptual images capture and invigorate a whole cultural alphabet, combining iconic qualities with virtues of simplicity, depth and humour. An image of Israel's map, for example, combines the political, mythical, visual and textual languages and thereby figures the intricate and tension-ridden Israeli place as both a direct experience and an emblem branded in Zionists and Israeli minds. In another exemplary work Sgan-Cohen portrayed himself as a Kabbalist who holds in his hand the tree of spheres assembled from parts of a child's old wooden toy. Rather than dissolving into mystical trance, he foregrounds the very language game and play of the artistic-cultural act.

Gallery

Education 
 1965–1969 BA History of Art and Philosophy, The Hebrew University of Jerusalem
 1969–1973 MA History of Art, University of California, Los Angeles, US
 1989 PhD City University of New York City, New York City, US

Teaching 
 1973–1978 – Brooklyn College, New York City
 1977–1978 – Bezalel Academy of Arts and Design, Jerusalem
 1977–1978 – University of Haifa, Haifa
 1979 – School of Visual Arts, New York City
 1990–1998 – Art Institute – Oranim Academic College, Kiryat Tivon
 1990–1998 – Bezalel Academy of Arts and Design, Jerusalem
 1990–1998 – Kalisher Art Academy, Tel Aviv-Yafo

Solo exhibitions 
 1978 Hakibbutz Gallery, Tel Aviv
 1993 Library Foyar, Tel Aviv Museum of Art
 1994  "Michael Sgan-Cohen, Paintings, 1978 – to date", Museum of Israeli Art, Ramat-Gan
 2004 "Michael Sgan-Cohen, a Retrospective", The Israel Museum, Jerusalem

Two-artist exhibitions 
 1995 "Twice over", Haim Maor and Michael Sgan-Cohen, Bar-David Museum, Bar-Am
 1996  "Painting a Land", Tzibi Geva and Michael Sgan-Cohen, Julie M. Gallery, Tel Aviv
 2008 Idan Erez / Michael Sgan-Cohen, Hamidrasha Gallery, Tel Aviv

Group exhibitions

Awards and prizes 
 1994–1999 Artist-in-residence, The Jerusalem Foundation, Jerusalem
 1998 Ministry of Education and Culture Prize
 1997 George and Janet Jaffin Prize for Excellence in Plastic Arts, America-Israel Cultural Foundation
 2001–02, 2002–03 Memorial Foundation for Jewish Culture, New York City

Selected art critic and writings 
 Michael Sgan-Cohen, "The Jewish Experience in Art", Art in America, May- June 1976, pp. 44–47
 Michael Sgan-Cohen, "Kiesler on stage and off", Theatre design, Art in America, summer 1981, pp. 37–39
 Michael Sgan-Cohen, "Motti Mizrahi: A New Song", The Venice Biennale, 1988, The Israeli Pavilion
 Michael Sgan-Cohen, "Frederick Kiesler: Artist, Architect, Visionary, A study on his work and writing", 1989, PhD, CUNY, New York (A short summary that was compiled by Valentina Sonzogni for the Kiesler Foundation research department in order to add information to the status quo of the international research.)
 Michael Sgan-Cohen, "Yaakov Dorchin: East of Eden", Dorchin, The Venice Biennale, 1990, The Israeli Pavilion
 Michael Sgan-Cohen, "Le Sanctuaire du Livre et L'art de transformer le superflu en nécessaire", Collection Monographie Frederick Kiesler sous la direction de Chantai Béret, Edition du Centre Georges Pompidou, 1996, pp. 229–239
 Michael Sgan-Cohen, "Ketav and Hebrew in Israeli Art" Flesh and Word in Israeli Art, Ackland Art Museum, The University of North Carolina at Chapel Hill, (Catalogue) pp. 41–51

Selected Hebrew writings 
 "Cain, artist, Wandering Jew", Proza, No. 43, Dec. 1980, pp. 28–30 (Hebrew)
 "Assumptions Concerning the possibility of the Birth of Jewish-Israeli Art", Jerusalem, Vol. 11–12, Bezalel, Feb. 1984, pp. 79–87 (Hebrew)
 "Between New York and Jerusalem" Kav, June 1984, pp. 64–76 (Hebrew)
 "Tzeva" (color), Bezalel No.1, Feb. 1984, pp. 67–73 (Hebrew)
 "A Cautious Touch of Sources", Studio, No. 14, Sept. 1990, p. 32 (Hebrew)
 "Hur and Aharon – An Autointerview on Art, Religion and Israeliness", Studio, No. 17, Dec. 1990 (Hebrew)
 "From the Horse Mouth", Studio, No. 52, April 1994, pp. 15–19 (Hebrew)

Further reading 
Doreet Levitte-Harten, "Protest und Mitleid in der zeitgenossischen", Nike 19, Juli–Sep. 1987, pp. 8–9
Gideon Ofrat, "Flesh and Word in Israeli Art", Ackland Art Museum, The University of North Carolina at Chapel Hill, Curator:  Gideon Ofrat (Catalogue)
Gideon Ofrat, "One Hundred Years of Art in Israel", Westview Press, a division of Harper Collins Publication, 1998, pp. 326–327
Arturo Schwarz, "Towards the Sublime / Michael Sgan-Cohen", Love at First Sight, Israel Museum, Jerusalem, pp. 34–37, 2000
Milly Heyd, Selbstportrats: Zor Frage da Judischen Identitat, Das Rech des Bilds, "Jusische Perspektiven in der Modernnen Kunst", Herausgegeben von Hans Gunter Golinski und Sepp Hiokisch Picard, 2003, pp. 86–120
Ayelet Kohn, "Haaretz", Michael Sgan-Cohen, Journal of Visual Literacy, Vol. 24 Number 1, Spring 2004
Judith Margolis, "Resident Artist: Spiritual Androgyny in the Art of Michael Sgan-Cohen and Carole Berman", Nashim: A Journal of Jewish Women's Studies & Gender Issues No. 10, Jewish Women's Spirituality (2) Published by: Indiana University Press (Fall, 5766/2005), pp. 225–242, 
Yael Guilat, Between Painting and Poetry, Sacred and Secular Realms: Yehudah Amichai and Michael Sgan–Cohen, Pictorial Languages and their Meanings, Liber Amicorum in Honor of Nurith Kenaan-Kedar, Edited by Christine B. Verzar and G. Fishhof, Tel Aviv University, The Yolanda and David Katz Faculty of the Arts, 2006, pp. 295–304
 Emma Azriel Gashinski, "A Split Identity – The Uncanny in Michael Sgan-Cohen’s Art", The Protocols of Bezalel's Young, Issue No. 9, July 2008
 Shulamit Laderman,"The unique significance of the Hebrew Alphabet in the works of Mordecai Ardon and Michael Sgan-Cohen", Arts Judaica, The Bar-Ilan Journal of Jewish Art, Volume 5, 2009, pp. 85–107
 David Heyd, "Between Response and Responsiveness: On Michael Sgan-Cohen's Hinneni", Jewish Dimensions in Modern Visual Culture, eds. Matthew Baigell, Milly Heyd, Rose-Carol Washton Long, Brandeis Press (8 December 2009), pp. 273–285
 Milly Heyd, "Word and Image: The Leviathan in Michael Sgan-Cohen’s' Art", Jewish Dimensions in Modern Visual Culture, eds. Rose Carol, Washton Long, Matthew Baigell and Milly Heyd, Brandeis Press (8 December 2009), pp. 193–219

References

External links 
 "Michael Sgan-Cohen". Information Center for Israeli Art. The Israel Museum 
Michael Sgan-Cohen: A Retrospective. 9 November 2004 – 21 May 2005.  The Israel Museum
"Michael Sgan-Cohen" at the Israel Museum Collection
"Michael Sgan-Cohen" The Bezalel Narkiss Index of Jewish Art, The Center for Jewish Art, The Hebrew University of Jerusalem

20th-century Israeli painters
20th-century Israeli male artists
Israeli contemporary artists
Israeli conceptual artists
Artists from Jerusalem
Jewish Israeli artists
1944 births
1999 deaths
Brooklyn College faculty